Nikitas may refer to:

Places
 Nikitas, village in Cyprus

Given name
 Nikitas Kaklamanis (born 1946), Greek politician
 Nikitas Kocheilas (born 1983), Greek water polo player
 Nikitas Loulias (born 1955), American bishop
 Nikitas Platis (1912–1984), Greek actor
 Nikitas Venizelos (born 1930), Greek shipping magnate and politician

Surname
 Derek Nikitas, American author
 Kali Nikitas (born 1964), American graphic designer
 Solon Nikitas (1937–2005), Cypriot judge

See also

 Nikita (disambiguation)